The Cartagena Refinery is an oil refinery in Cartagena, Colombia.  It is operated by Refineria de Cartagena S.A. (Reficar), a subsidiary of Ecopetrol.

History
The refinery was built by Intercol in 1956 and purchased by Ecopetrol in 1976.

Technical features
The refinery consists of crude units, visbreaking units, fluid catalytic cracker, light products plants, polymerization plants, amine plants, sulfur plants, and impurities treatment plants.

References

Oil refineries in Colombia
Buildings and structures in Cartagena, Colombia
1956 establishments in Colombia